Marina Piccinini (born 1968) is an Italian American virtuoso flautist. She is noted for her performances of compositions by Mozart and Bach, and has performed with many of the world's top orchestras and conductors.

Early Life and Education

Marina Piccinini was born to an Italian father and a Brazilian mother, both mathematicians. As a child, she lived in Brazil, Switzerland, and Canada before moving to New York City to study at the Juilliard School. 

She began playing the flute at age 10 while living in St. John's, Newfoundland, and was self-taught. At the age of 16 she graduated from high School and moved to Toronto to study with Jeanne Baxtresser at the University of Toronto. Two years later, at the invitation of Julius Baker, she moved to New York City to study with him at the Juilliard School on scholarship, where she attained both a Bachelors and a Masters degree. 

During her years at the Juilliard School she also studied with Aurele Nicolet in Switzerland.

Biography
Piccinini was born in the United States to an Italian father and a Brazilian mother. Piccinini became interested in the operas of Mozart as a young girl at the age of 7, and began playing the flute at the age of 10. She grew up in Newfoundland, Canada and did not have formal flute lessons from a teacher until she was 16. In Toronto, she won First Prize in the CBC Young Performers Competition. She later moved to New York City to commence studying at the prestigious Juilliard School and won First Prize in New York's Concert Artists Guild International Competition.  She was awarded a scholarship by the Concert Artists Guild in 1986, winning First Prize in their international competition. In 1991, she became the first flutist to receive an Avery Fisher Career Grant from the Lincoln Center. and was named Young Artist to watch by Musical America. She has studied under mentors such as Jeanne Baxtresser,  Julius Baker.and Aurele Nicolet.

Piccinini has performed as a soloist with the Boston Symphony Orchestra, the London Philharmonic, the Tokyo Symphony Orchestra, Montreal Symphony Orchestra, Rotterdam Philharmonic Orchestra, National Symphony Orchestra, Saint Louis Symphony Orchestra, the Hanover Symphony Orchestra and many others throughout the United States. She has worked with such conductors as Alan Gilbert, Seiji Ozawa, Kurt Masur, Pierre Boulez, Leonard Slatkin, Stanislaw Skrowaczewski, Peter Oundjian, Esa-Pekka Salonen, Myung-whun Chung, and Gianandrea Noseda.

Piccinini has performed at New York's Town Hall, London's Southbank Centre and Wigmore Hall, the Weill Recital Hall and Zankell Hall of Carnegie Hall in New York City, Kennedy Center in Washington, D.C.  and at the Mozart Saal in Vienna's Konzerthaus.  She is a regular performer in Japan. She has collaborated with the pianist Mitsuko Uchida and numerous string quartets (such as Tokyo, Brentano, Mendelssohn, and Takács quartets) and has performed at the Casals Hall and Suntory Hall in Tokyo and at the Saito Kinen Festival. Piccinini is also a frequent guest at the Marlboro Festival in Vermont,  as well as at other summer festivals such as the Salzburg Festival, Mondsee festival) and Italy (Spoleto Festival) and Germany (Rheingau Musik Festival, Moritzburg Festival, Augsburg Festival) .

In September, 2001, Piccinini joined the faculty of the Peabody Institute and has made a name for herself as a teacher of flute. Piccinini is married to the pianist Andreas Haefliger; the pair have performed and recorded together,. Piccinin was performing with husband Haefliger at least as far back as 1992, when they put on a performance together on January 31, 1992 at the Sherwood Auditorium of the San Diego Museum of Contemporary Art. Piccinini permanently lived in New York City until 2002 when she relocated to Austria after being traumatized by the September 11 terrorist attacks, but still maintains a home in New York City. Piccinini has also requested flute concerto compositions from composers such as Paquito D'Rivera, notably The Bel Air Concerto Michael Colgrass (The Wild riot of the Shaman's Dreams (solo flute), A Flute in the Kingdom of Drums and Bells (flute and percussion quartet) and Crossworlds (Concerto for flute and piano)), Matthew Hindson (House Music) and others.

Widely recognized as one of the world's leading flute virtuosos, flutist MARINA PICCININI combines flawless technical command, profound interpretive instincts, and a charismatic stage presence—qualities which make each of her performances a memorable event.

Since making her acclaimed debuts in New York's Town Hall, London's Southbank Centre, and Tokyo's Suntory Hall, Ms. Piccinini has been in demand both as a recitalist and soloist with orchestras in the United States, Canada, Europe, and Japan. She has been soloist with the Boston Symphony Orchestra, the London Philharmonic, the Tokyo Symphony, St. Paul Chamber Orchestra, Montreal Symphony, Rotterdam Philharmonic, National Symphony Orchestra, Saint Louis Symphony, Minnesota Orchestra, Ottawa's National Arts Centre Orchestra; the Hannover Symphony in Germany, the Ravenna Chamber Orchestra in Italy and the Vienna Chamber Soloists; as well as the Cincinnati, New World, Toronto, Vancouver, Detroit, Phoenix, and Milwaukee symphony orchestras, and has worked with such conductors as Alan Gilbert, Seiji Ozawa, Kurt Masur, Pierre Boulez, Leonard Slatkin, Stanislaw Skrowaczewski, Peter Oundjian, Esa-Pekka Salonen, Myung-whun Chung, and Gianandrea Noseda.

Ms. Piccinini also performs with great frequency in recitals worldwide, with recent appearances in London's Wigmore Hall, Tokyo`s Casals Hall, the Seoul Arts Center, the Kennedy Center in Washington, and the Mozart Saal in Vienna's Konzerthaus. Deeply committed to the music of the present, recent seasons have been highlighted by significant world premiere performances of concerti and solo works by Michael Colgrass, Paquito D'Rivera, Matthew Hindson, Miguel Kertsman, Lukas Foss, Michael Torke, John Harbison, Marc-André Dalbavie, David Ludwig and Roberto Sierra.

A devoted chamber musician, Marina Piccinini has collaborated with the Tokyo, Brentano, Mendelssohn, and Takács string quartets and with the Percussion ensemble Nexus. Ms. Piccinini is a regular participant at the Marlboro Festival, often touring with Musicians From Marlboro. She  has also performed at the Salzburg Festival, Mostly Mozart, Santa Fe, Spoleto (Italy), La Jolla, Newport, Davos, Tivoli, Rheingau, Moritzburg and Kuhmo Festivals, among others. A frequent guest artist in Japan, Ms. Piccinini performed (by personal invitation of Seiji Ozawa) at the Saito Kinen Festival in Japan, and has appeared with noted pianist Mitsuko Uchida in a series of concerts at the  Suntory Hall in Tokyo and worldwide at Carnegie Hall's  Weill Recital Hall, Zankell Hall. Most recently she completed a  European tour which included such prestigious halls as Amsterdam's Concertgebow, Cologne's Philharmonie and the Barbican Centre in London. Ms. Piccinini has also been Guest Principal Flute with both the Boston Symphony and the New York Philharmonic.

Ms. Piccinini's latest CD release is a double CD set of the complete Flute Sonatas of J.S.Bach (including the solo Partita) in collaboration with the Brasil Guitar Duo for the British label Avie. Other recent recordings include an acclaimed collaboration with pianist Andreas Haefliger of the Sonatas of Prokofiev and Franck   (Avie), "Belle Époque (Paris, 1880-1913)", with pianist Anne Epperson, (Claves)  and a disc with pianist Eva Kupiec  of Sonatas by Bartok, Martinu, Schulhoff, Dohnányi, and Taktakishvili (Claves).

Marina Piccinini's career was launched when she won First Prize in the CBC Young Performers Competition in Canada, and a year later, First Prize in New York's Concert Artists Guild International Competition. She was cited by Musical America as a "Young Artist to Watch", and in 1991 she became the first flutist to win the coveted Avery Fisher Career Grant from Lincoln Center. She has been the recipient of numerous awards and grants including twice the NEA's Solo Recitalist Grant, the McMeen-Smith Award, the BP Artists Career Award, and various grants from the Canada Council. She was also the winner in the New York Flute Club competition and the National Arts Club Competition.

Ms. Piccinini began her flute studies in Toronto with Jeanne Baxtresser, received her BM and MM degrees from the Juilliard school where she studied with the legendary flutist Julius Baker and worked with Aurele Nicolet in Switzerland. Ms. Piccinini frequently gives master classes around the world and is currently on the faculty of the Peabody Institute.

Ms. Piccinini is married to the pianist Andreas Haefliger; along with their daughter they divide their time between Vienna and New York.

In 2010 she  released an album recording of the  complete Flute Sonatas of J.S. Bach  in collaboration with the Brasil Guitar Duo,  who also won a scholarship at the Concert Artists Guild .

She is Professor of Flute at the Peabody Institute of the Johns Hopkins University in Baltimore and was previously also Professor at the Hannover Hochschule fur Musik, Theater und Medien. She is the founder and director of MPIMC (Marina Piccinini international Competition) and a long time resident artist at the Marlboro Music Festival.

Commissions

Marina Piccinini has commissioned and premiered pieces by leading composers, including Concerti by Paquito D'Rivera (Gran Danzon), John Harbison (Flute Concerto). Aaron Jay Kernis (Flute Concerto), Christopher Theofanidis (The Universe in Ecstatic Motion), Miguel Kertsman (Concerto for Flute, Strings and Percussion), and Matthew Hindson (House Music). 

Other works include Toshio Hosokawa (Arabesque) John Harrison (Mark the Date) Tebogo Monnakgotla (it is the lark that sings...)  Marc-Andre Dalbavie (Nocturne) Roberto Sierra

Pedagogue

Since 2001, Piccinini has served as Professor of Flute at the Peabody Institute of the Johns Hopkins University in Baltimore. From 2014-17 she was also Professor at the Hochschule für Musik, Theater und Medien Hannoverin Germany. 

She is the founder and director of the Marina Piccinini International Masterclasses (MPIMC) - Marina Piccinini international Masterclasses. From 2008-216, MPIMC was held at the Peabody institute. In 2017 they began a new relationship with the New World Symphony and consequently the classes were held at the New World Center in Miami Beach. In 2020, due to the corona virus pandemic, MPIMC moved to an online platform, creating MPIMC Online. In 2022 MPIMC began yet another relationship, hosting live classes at the Potash Hill Campus of the Marlboro Music Festival and School. In 2023 MPIMC hosted a mini Pop-Up Online session "All about Auditions"

Piccinini has given masterclasses around the world in various Institutions, Festivals, and settings. From 115-2005 she was the Flute professor at the Muraltengut Stiftung fur Musik in Zurich, Switzerland.

Critical Acclaim

Personal Life

Marina Piccinini is married to pianist Andreas Haefliger and they have one daughter, artist/philosopher Chiara Haefliger. 
Marina is a 36th generation Shaolin Warrior Monk.

References

External links
Marina Piccinini: Columbia Artists Management, Inc.
Peabody Studio Homepage
Official Personal Homepage

American flautists
1968 births
American people of Italian descent
American people of Brazilian descent
Living people
American expatriates in Austria
Johns Hopkins University faculty
Juilliard School alumni
Peabody Institute faculty
Women flautists
Women music educators